Vito's is an Italian restaurant in Seattle's First Hill neighborhood, in the U.S. state of Washington.

History 
Vito's opened in 1953. The restaurant has hosted an annual costume competition for Halloween, along with "sibling" establishment The Hideout.

See also 

 List of Italian restaurants

References

External links 

 
 Vito's Restaurant (Seattle) by Nick Rousso (April 6, 2021), HistoryLink.org
 Vito's at Zomato

1953 establishments in Washington (state)
First Hill, Seattle
Italian restaurants in Seattle
Restaurants established in 1953